Chhatwan is a village in Keotiranway Tehsil, Darbhanga District, Bihar, India.

Chhatwan has its panchayat which is registered as the name of Gram Panchayat Raj Chhatwan. Chhatwan Panchayat is divided into 14 wards.

History
Chhatwan was established during the time of Akbar by Zamiruddin Sardar and Nazir Ali son of 
Mohammad Gulam Nabi 
a Zamindar of the village. The name of the village was inspired by the Alstonia scholars (Chhatwan) of the terrace. There was a garden of Alstonia scholaris tree, one of the Translators in Akabari Darbar. After the establishment of New Raj Darbhanga, several expansions took place to develop the taxation system in the Mithila (region). Raj Darbhanga had 4,495 villages in 18 circles in Bihar and Bengal and employed over 7,500 officers to manage the estate at that time.

According to an article in the Dainik Jagran, Mahatma Gandhi came after a gruesome crisis in 1934. He was accompanied by Pandit Jawaharlal Nehru, Jamnalal Bajaj, Dr. Rajendra Prasad, J. B. Kripalani, etc. They were dismayed by the devastation caused by the earthquake, however, the people of Mithilanchal refused to accept the relief given by the British government and the Congress. He told the people that it is not a crime to seek help in times of calamity. The earthquake victims started the relay on their call. They went to the Chhatwan village in Keoti Block to know the misery of earthquake victims. There was a meeting with the Chhatwan villager at Devi Lal Pokhar, which is today known as Gandhi Chowk Chhatwan.

Geography
Chhatwan is a large village located in Keotiranway, Darbhanga district, Bihar. Nearby towns and villages include Loam (3.2 km), Raiyam Factory (5 km), Muria (5.4 km) and Keoti (7.8 km), Darbhanga (16 km), Madhubani (13 km) and Pandaul (9.8 km). The Madhubani Road crosses through the village, which is also near National Highway 27 (5.9 km), a main east-west corridor. The Nearest Railway Station is Tarsrai Station; 6.4 km away.

Demographics
As of 2011, per the Population Census, Chhatwan was home to resident 2339 families, with a total population of 11054,

Sex Ratio

Males= 51.92%
Females= 48.08%

Chhatwan has its Panchayat. Chhatwan village has a lower literacy rate compared to Bihar as a whole. In 2011, the literacy rate of Chhatwan village was 55.77% compared to 61.80% for all Bihar. Male literacy in Chhatwan stands at 63.77%, while the female literacy rate was 47.05%.

Economy
Agriculture is the main industry of the village, though development has not been significant.  The Jeewach river, flowing through the east of Chhatwan, provides a fertile flood plain that serves as the basis for growing local crops. Mango fruits are grown in abundance, and sugarcane is produced before shipping to the Raiyam sugar factory for processing. It is also well known for its many markets as well as Chhatwan Bazaar and small businesses, which include cloth shops, jewelry, general stores, hardware stores, and bike showrooms. The main market of Chhatwan is the Gandhi Chowk, Azad Chowk, Chandni Chowk, A.P.J. Abdul Kalam Chowk, Kunwar Chowk & Maulana Mazharul Haque Chowk on the Madhubani Road.

Culture
Chhatwan is a multi-cultural society. Among the Muslim festivals celebrated are Eid al-Fitr (Eid), Eid al-Adha (Bakraeid) and Muharram. Hindu festivals celebrated include Chhath, five days after Deepawali, Makar Sankranti, Durga Puja, and Diwali

Education
There are so many resources of education in Chhatwan, Islamic as well as modern education For modern education many governments and private schools are also there.

 Prathmik School Chhatwan Harijan
 Rajkiya Utkramit Uchcha School Chhatwan Basic
 Prathmik School Chhatwan Urdu
 Rajkiya Utkramit Madhya School Dhanushi
 Prathmik School Patharpatti
 Project Prathmik School Fakir Takiya Chhatwan
 Red Rose Public School Chhatwan

For Islamic education, there are two madrasas Both Madrasa is government Recognised

 Madarsa Tul Banat Chhatwan
 Madarsa Noorul Islam Chhatwan

Hospital
 Additional Primary Health Center Chhatwan
 Veterinary Hospital Chhatwan

Transportation

Roadways
Chhatwan is well connected with another part of village and cities, Tarsarai - Raiyam Road via Chhatwan passes through the village which is connected to National Highway 27 and Tarsarai Station North End, and the South end is connected to Madhubani District, Chhatwan - Hajipur Road Connected to the National Highway 527B West End and East End connected to Chhatwan - Pandaul
Chhatwan has auto-rickshaw services to nearby village and cities, and bus services to Darbhanga - Madhubani, via Raiyam sugar factory, Chhatwan - Darbhanga, via Khirma.

Railways
The nearest railway station is Tarsrai Railway Station (TRS). People who wish to visit Delhi can take a direct train from the Tarsarai railway station. Two express train stops Here :

 Sarayu Yamuna Express to Amritsar
 Shaheed Express to Amritsar

Many more passengers train stop here.

Airways
Darbhanga Airport is the nearest airport from Chhatwan which distance is (17Km).

Climate

Chhatwan has a humid subtropical climate (Köppen climate classification Cwa).

References

Map of Chhatwan Village in Keotiranway Tehsil, Darbhanga, Bihar
Weather Chhatwan | Best Time to Visit Chhatwan | Chhatwan Climate Forecast Temperature Snowfall - Holiday Travel Reports

Villages in Darbhanga district